Inuktitut Braille is a proposed braille alphabet of the Inuktitut language based on Inuktitut syllabics.  Unlike syllabics, it is a true alphabet, with separate letters for consonants and vowels, though vowels are written before the consonants they follow in speech.  It was published in 2012 by Tamara Kearney, Manager of Braille Research and Development at the Commonwealth Braille and Talking Book Cooperative.  The book ᐃᓕᐊᕐᔪᒃ ᓇᓄᕐᓗ The Orphan and the Polar Bear was the first (and perhaps only) work transliterated into Inuktitut Braille.

Chart
Each letter of Inuktitut syllabics is transliterated with two braille cells.  The first cell indicated the orientation of the syllabic letter, and the second its shape.  Since the orientation of a letter indicates the vowel of a syllable, and shape indicates the consonant, this means that the syllable ki, for example, is written ik.  Vowel length, indicated with a diacritic dot in syllabics, is written by adding an extra dot to the consonant letter in braille, so that the syllable kī is effectively written iķ in braille.

Vowels
The four vowel letters are as follows:
{| class="wikitable Unicode" style="line-height: 1.2"
|- align=center
|  ai
|  i
|  u
|  a
|}

The vowels u and a mimic the orientations of some consonants carrying these vowels, being practically identical to the null-consonant syllables ᐅ u and ᐊ a as well as to ᐳ pu and ᐸ pa.

Vowel letters do not occur alone, but are carried by a null consonant  to write a vowel-initial syllable.  For a long vowel, a dot is added to the null consonant letter, . Thus the syllables consisting of a vowel only are written:
  ᐁ ai  
  ᐃ i 
  ᐄ ī 
  ᐅ u 
  ᐆ ū 
  ᐊ a 
  ᐋ ā

Consonants follow English Braille as closely as possible. Syllables beginning with  combine  with a vowel cell, as follows:
  ᑫ kai  
  ᑭ ki 
  ᑯ ku 
  ᑲ ka 
And with long vowels:
  ᑮ kī 
  ᑰ kū 
  ᑳ kā 
These vowel letters are used consistently, according to the spoken phonemic vowel, regardless of whether the orientation of symmetry of the syllabic letter is orthogonal in print, as in the null consonant above, or diagonal, as in k.

Consonants
Inuktitut braille consonants were chosen according to romanized Inuktitut rather than syllabics. For example, ᖅ q is written with the single letter , braille q, rather than as ᕐ r plus ᒃ k as it is in syllabics.

Consonant assignments differ somewhat from English and international conventions. Since v in English Braille, has a dot at position 6, which is used for long vowels in Inuktitut Braille, the letter for the similar sound f, was substituted for ᕝ v. The Inuktitut letters for ng, nng, and ł have no simple equivalent in English Braille, so the braille letters for English e, d, and c are used. The consonants are therefore as follows:

{| class="wikitable Unicode" style="line-height: 1.2"
|- align=center
!Final consonant orconsonant with a short vowel
|  ᑉ p
|  ᑦ t
|  ᒃ k
|  ᒡ g
|  ᒻ m
|  ᓐ n
|  ᔅ s
|  ᓪ l
|- align=center
!Consonant with a long vowel
|  p_:
|  t_:
|  k_:
|  g_:
|  m_:
|  n_:
|  s_:
|  l_:
|- align=center
!colspan=9| 
|- align=center
!(short vowel or final)
|  ᔾ j
|  ᕝ v
|  ᕐ r
|  ᖅ q
|  ᖕ ng
|  ᖖ nng
|  ᖦ ł
|  ' h
|- align=center
!(long vowel)
|  j_:
|  v_:
|  r_:
|  q_:
|  ng_:
|  nng_:
|  ł_:
|  h_:
|}

Inuktitut syllabics are irregular for the last few letters:  ng and nng are only diacritics, and require a carrying letter g to support a vowel; ł has irregular rotation, and h is a diacritic requiring the null consonant to support a vowel.  In Inuktitut Braille, however, they behave as any other consonant, so that all CV syllables are written with two braille cells regardless of how the consonant is written in syllabics.  For example, ᙱ nngi is just , and ᕼᐃ hi is just .

Digits and punctuation

Examples
The following is a sample text, first in braille, then in syllabics and romanization.

⠕⠁⠪⠟⠘⠇⠪⠭⠘⠗⠞⠀⠕⠁⠪⠟⠕⠁⠘⠎⠪⠟⠟⠕⠞⠘⠝⠅
ᐅᖃᓕᒫᕆᑦ ᐅᖃᐅᓯᖃᖅᑐᓂᒃ 
uqalimārit uqausiqaqtunit

⠘⠁⠕⠝⠕⠟⠘⠞⠞⠪⠞⠂⠀⠘⠁⠘⠇⠟⠕⠅⠘⠎⠕⠟⠘⠞⠞⠪⠞⠂
ᐃᓄᖁᑎᑦᑕ, ᐃᓕᖅᑯᓯᖁᑎᑦᑕ, 
inuqutitta, iliqkusiqutitta,

⠕⠡⠪⠍⠕⠚⠞⠂⠀⠘⠁⠘⠇⠪⠞⠘⠗⠪⠚⠕⠁⠚⠕⠚⠘⠞⠞⠪⠞⠂
ᐆᒪᔪᑦ, ᐃᓕᑕᕆᔭᐅᔾᔪᑎᑦᑕ, 
ūmajut, ilitarijaujjutitta,

⠘⠏⠘⠛⠪⠁⠗⠘⠝⠘⠗⠪⠇⠕⠁⠟⠪⠞⠞⠪⠞⠂
ᐱᒋᐊᕐᓂᕆᓚᐅᖅᑕᑦᑕ, 
pigiarnirilauqtatta,

⠕⠝⠪⠝⠕⠋⠪⠾⠟⠘⠎⠪⠍⠘⠝⠞⠪⠞⠕⠇
ᓄᓇᕗᑖᖅᓯᒪᓂᑦᑕᓗ 
nunavutāqsimanittalu

⠘⠍⠅⠪⠮⠕⠽⠪⠑⠕⠚⠘⠝⠅⠂⠀⠪⠁⠍⠪⠍⠕⠇
ᒥᒃᓵᓅᖓᔪᓂᒃ, ᐊᒻᒪᓗ 
miksānūngajunik, ammalu

⠪⠁⠘⠍⠕⠎⠅⠪⠅⠝⠘⠝⠗⠘⠝⠅⠲
ᐊᒥᓱᒃᑲᓐᓂᕐᓂᒃ.
amisukkannirnik.

References
 Inuktitut Braille discussion and charts

See also
Iñupiaq Braille

French-ordered braille alphabets
Inuktitut
Writing systems introduced in 2012